In reflection seismology, stacking velocity, or Normal Moveout (NMO) velocity, is the value of the seismic velocity obtained from the best fit of the traveltime curve by a hyperbola.. The hyperbolic approximation to the traveltime curve (two-way travel time versus offset) is known as Normal moveout (NMO). The procedure of finding the best fit on common midpoint (CMP) seismic gathers is known as NMO velocity analysis.

References

Seismology